The Story of My Life is the fifth studio album released by American country singer/songwriter Deana Carter. The album peaked at #26 on the U.S. Top Country Albums chart and #150 on the Billboard 200. "One Day at a Time" was released in March 2005 as the lead single, and entered the Billboard Hot Country Songs chart for the week of April 9, 2005 at #57. It peaked at #55 after three weeks, and returned to the charts for two additional weeks in late June/early July. Follow-up singles "The Girl You Left Me For," "Sunny Day," and "In a Heartbeat" did not chart.

Track listing
"The Girl You Left Me For" (Deana Carter, James Michael) – 3:30
"One Day at a Time" (Carter) – 3:18
"Ordinary" (Carter, Hillary Lindsey, Troy Verges) – 4:15
"In a Heartbeat" (Carter, Michael) – 3:55
"Katie" (Carter) – 2:40
"Atlanta & Birmingham" (Carter) – 3:37
"She's Good for You" (Carter, Carolyn Dawn Johnson) – 3:34
"Not Another Love Song" (Carter) – 4:35
"Sunny Day" (Carter) – 5:16
"Getting Over You" (Carter, Lindsey, Verges) – 3:31
"The Story of My Life" (Carter) – 3:10

Personnel
Deana Carter - lead vocals, acoustic guitar, piano, electric guitar, synthesizer strings, synthesizer horns, background vocals
Jeff Carter - electric guitar, acoustic guitar
Randy Leago - keyboards, piano, synthesizer, flute, accordion
Steve Mackey – bass guitar
James Michael – drums, acoustic guitar, electric guitar, piano, programming, synthesizer, keyboards, background vocals
Kyle Woodring – drums

Charts

Album

Singles

References

2005 albums
Deana Carter albums
Vanguard Records albums